Oujiang may refer to:

Oujiang, Hunan, a town in Guidong County, Hunan, China
Ou River (Zhejiang), a river in Zhejiang, China
Wenzhounese, a Sinitic language from Wenzhou, Zhejiang, China